Naujan, officially the Municipality of Naujan,  is a 1st class municipality in the province of Oriental Mindoro, Philippines. According to the 2020 census, it has a population of 109,587 people.

It assumed the status of a full-fledged municipality on January 4, 1905, under Act 1280. Its boundaries were permanently established in 1919.

Geography

Climate

Barangays
Naujan is politically subdivided into 71 barangays.

Demographics

Economy

Government
2022Elected officials:
 Municipal Mayor: Henry Joel C.Teves
 Vice Mayor: Great Delos Reyes
 Sangguniang Bayan Members:
 Arago Toti, Councilor
 Vilma D. Vargas, Councilor
 Wil Viray, Councilor
 Howard Arteza, Councilor
 Joefel Ylagan, Councilor
 Elmar De villa, Councilor
 Allan Balbacal, Councilor
 Reuel Laygo, Councilor
 Engr. Ralph Jonnel D. Recto, ABC President
Wyne Wyvvky G. Delos Reyes, SKMF President<Sangguniang Bayan>
 Rogelio Banlugan, Indigenous Peoples Mandatory Representative

See also
List of Cultural Properties of the Philippines in Naujan, Oriental Mindoro
 Naujan Lake

References

External links
Naujan Profile at PhilAtlas.com
[ Philippine Standard Geographic Code]

www-naujan-gov.blogspot.com
Naujan.com

Municipalities of Oriental Mindoro